Yerma is an opera in three acts by Heitor Villa-Lobos based on the tragedy of the same name by Federico García Lorca.

History
Yerma was commissioned in 1955 by an old friend of Villa-Lobos, Hugh Ross, the conductor of the New York Schola Cantorum, and by John Blankenship, at that time head of the drama department at Sarah Lawrence College. The original plan was that García Lorca's play would be translated into English by the Scottish poet Alastair Reid, but Villa-Lobos immediately began setting the original Spanish text. It was composed partly in New York, partly in Paris, and was finished in 1956.

Yerma was first performed by the Santa Fe Opera in Santa Fe, New Mexico, on August 12, 1971 (erroneously reported in one source as July 12), and repeated just once, on August 18. The Santa Fé premiere was produced by Basil Langton, choreographed by José Limón, with scenery by Allen Charles Klein. Paintings by Giorgio de Chirico were projected on the walls during the intermissions.

The title role was sung by the Mexican soprano María Luisa Tamez, supported by Brazilian tenor Benito Maresca and Uruguayan baritone Fernando Barabino. Staging was by Jorge Curi, and David Machado conducted. A concert version was presented from July 12–21, 1989 by Opera on the Move in the Queen Elizabeth Hall at the Southbank's Latin American Festival, "Viva!", with Anna Steiger in the title role and Odaline de la Martinez conducting, while the European staged premiere was given by the Bielefeld Opera in 1991. The opera was given its second staging in Brazil at the Teatro Amazonas in Manaus in April 2010. The lead roles were taken by Eliane Coelho, Marcelo Puente, Homero Velho, and Keila de Moraes. Marcelo de Jesus conducted.

Roles

Reception
Despite the fact that it occurred twelve years after the composer's death, the Santa Fé premiere of Yerma attracted widespread attention from the press, not only from American publications like the New York Times and Newsweek, but also from several Swiss newspapers and the Brazilian daily, Jornal do Brasil, the latter no doubt because the opera was the work of the most distinguished Brazilian composer of his time.

Recordings
 Villa-Lobos: Yerma. , John Wakefield, Frederica von Stade, Theodor Uppman, Elaine Bonazzi. conductor: Christopher Keene. Live recording, August 12, 1971, Santa Fe. CD recording, 2 audio discs: analogue, 4¾ in., stereo. CDALD4442S]. Duluth, Georgia: House of Opera, n.d.

References

Sources

Further reading
 Anon. (1971). "Music: Infertility Rites". Time (Monday, August 23).
 Anon. (1991). "Bielefeld". Oper und Konzert 29 (January): 29.
 Bernheimer, Martin (1971). "Santa Fé: Posthumous Villa-Lobos". Opera 22 (Autumn): 98–100.
 Emert, Harold (1983). "Yerma Comes Home at Last". High Fidelity: Musical America Edition 33 (December): 32–34.
 Fairman, R. (1989). "Yerma (Villa-Lobos): Opera on the Move at the Queen Elizabeth Hall". Opera 40 (October): 1260.
 Faro, A. J. (1984). "Rio de Janaeiro". Opera 35 (February): 188–189.
 Ferraz, Antonio Paulo (1988). "Yerma". Revista do Brasil 4, no. 1:81–90.
 Gilmore M. S. (1975). "Bel Air, Maryland". Opera News 40 (October): 54–55.
 Gruber, Alexander, Frank J. Harders-Wuthenow, John Dew, Horst Henke, Federico García Lorca, and Heitor Villa-Lobos (1990). Yerma [programme booklet]. Stadttheater Bielefeld.
 Potter, Keith (1989). "Viva: Impressions of Latin America". The Musical Times 130, no. 1760 ("Aspects of the Keyboard", October): 626–627.
 
 Sutcliffe, J. H. (1991). "Bielefeld". Opera 42 (March): 322–324.
 Waugh, Lynne (1971). "Vivas for Villa-Lobos Yerma". The Christian Science Monitor 63 (August 14): 7.

Operas by Heitor Villa-Lobos
Spanish-language operas
1971 operas
Operas
Operas set in Spain
Operas based on plays